In enzymology, a magnesium protoporphyrin IX methyltransferase is an enzyme that catalyzes the chemical reaction

S-adenosyl-L-methionine + magnesium protoporphyrin IX  S-adenosyl-L-homocysteine + magnesium protoporphyrin IX 13-methyl ester

The two substrates of this enzyme are S-adenosyl methionine and magnesium protoporphyrin IX; its two products are S-adenosylhomocysteine and magnesium protoporphyrin IX 13-methyl ester.

This enzyme belongs to the family of transferases, specifically those transferring one-carbon group methyltransferases.  The systematic name of this enzyme class is S-adenosyl-L-methionine:magnesium-protoporphyrin-IX O-methyltransferase. This enzyme is part of the biosynthetic pathway to chlorophylls.

See also
 Biosynthesis of chlorophylls

References

 
 
 
 
 

EC 2.1.1
Enzymes of unknown structure